Jusepe is a masculine Spanish given name, equivalent to Joseph. Notable people with the name include:

 Jusepe de Ribera (1591-1652), Spanish painter
 Jusepe Leonardo (1616-1656), Spanish painter
 Jusepe Gutierrez (ca.1572 - ?), Native American guide and explorer

Spanish masculine given names